The 1974 Long Beach State 49ers football team represented California State University, Long Beach during the 1974 NCAA Division I football season.

Cal State Long Beach competed in the Pacific Coast Athletic Association. The team was led by first year head coach Wayne Howard, and played the majority of their home games at Veterans Stadium adjacent to the campus of Long Beach City College in Long Beach, California. In addition, they played one home game at Anaheim Stadium in Anaheim, California. They finished the season with a record of six wins, five losses (6–5, 1–3 PCAA).

Schedule

Team players in the NFL
The following were selected in the 1975 NFL Draft.

Notes

References

Long Beach State
Long Beach State 49ers football seasons
Long Beach State 49ers football